The surgical neck of the humerus is a bony constriction at the proximal end of shaft of humerus. It is situated distal to the greater tubercle and lesser tubercle, and proximal to the deltoid tuberosity.

Clinical significance 
The surgical neck is much more frequently fractured than the anatomical neck of the humerus. This type of fracture takes place when the humerus is forced in one direction while the joint capsule and the rotator cuff muscles remain intact. A fracture in this area is most likely to cause damage to the axillary nerve and posterior circumflex humeral artery. Damage to the axillary nerve affects function of the teres minor and deltoid muscles, resulting in loss of abduction of arm (from 15-90 degrees), weak flexion, extension, and rotation of shoulder as well as loss of sensation of the skin over a small part of the lateral shoulder.

Additional images

See also
 Quadrangular space
 Anatomical neck of the humerus

References

External links
 
 
 

Humerus